On the Beach may refer to:

Fiction
On the Beach (novel), a 1957 novel by Nevil Shute
On the Beach (1959 film), an American adaptation of Shute's novel, by Stanley Kramer
On the Beach (2000 film), an American-Australian television film based on Shute's novel, by Russell Mulcahy
"On the Beach" (ER), a 2002 TV episode
On the Beach (play), a 2009 play by Steve Waters

Music

Albums
On the Beach (Chris Rea album) or the title song (see below), 1986
On the Beach (Neil Young album) or the title song, 1974
On the Beach, by Phil Cohran and the Artistic Heritage Ensemble, 1968

Songs
"On the Beach" (Chris Rea song), 1986; covered by York as "O.T.B. (On the Beach)", 1999
"On the Beach" (Cliff Richard song), 1964
"On the Beach (In the Summertime)", by the 5th Dimension, 1970
"On the Beach", by the Chameleons from What Does Anything Mean? Basically, 1985

Other uses
On the Beach (painting), a 1908 oil on canvas painting
On the Beach (business), a UK-based travel retailer
On the beach (nautical), a Royal Navy term for "retired from the Service"